A Schur function may be:
A Schur polynomial
A holomorphic function in the Schur class